Abi Zeider (31 August 1920 Valga – 12 March 1999 Tallinn) was a Jewish-Estonian musician, trumpeter.

He was mostly an autodidact. 1946-1952 he took private classes from J. Vaks and N. Kubli. During WW II he played at 8th Estonian Rifle Corps' orchestra. 1946-1957 he played at several orchestras in Tallinn. 1957-1980 he was the concert master of Estonian Television and Radio estrade orchestra. He played/acted also on several films, e.g. "Valge laev" (1970).

Awards:
 1967: Estonian SSR Merited Artist

References

1920 births
1999 deaths
Estonian musicians
Trumpeters
Soviet musicians